Eristena minutale is a moth in the family Crambidae. It was described by Aristide Caradja in 1932. It is found in China.

References

Acentropinae
Moths described in 1932